The Pouce Coupe River  is a major tributary of the Peace River in Alberta and British Columbia, Canada. Its name is officially spelled Pouce Coupé River, but it is commonly written without the acute accent.

Originating in Alberta's Saddle Hills County, it flows into British Columbia's Peace River Regional District, then returns in Alberta in Clear Hills County, where it empties into the Peace River.

The region of Pouce Coupe Prairie, from which the river and village of Pouce Coupe take their names, was called that for a Beaver Indian Chief named 'Pouscapee'. The first European settler in the region was Hector Tremblay, who built a cabin there in 1898.  Tremblay, of French origin, translated 'Pouskapee's Prairie' into the nearest French words of similar sound (meaning "cut thumb" or "cut-off thumb").

Course
It flows west and receives the waters of Boone Creek before reaching the British Columbia–Alberta border.

The river then turns northwest to the village of Pouce Coupe. The Pouce Coupe Regional Park is established on the banks of the river east of the village and Highway2, at the confluence with Bissette Creek.

It receives the waters of Dawson Creek east of the city of Dawson Creek, then turns northeast, entering once again the province of Alberta, north of Highway 49. Ammonite fossils harvested from the geological formations opened in the canyon can be found in the Dawson Creek Northern Alberta Railways Park museum.

Tributaries and crossings

From its origin to its mouth, Pouce Coupe River encounters the following tributaries and crossings:

See also
List of British Columbia rivers
List of Alberta rivers

References

Rivers of British Columbia
Rivers of Alberta
Peace River Country
Peace River Regional District